Miguel Triana Ruiz de Cote (Bogotá, Granadine Confederation, 26 November 1859 - Bogotá, Colombia, 29 April 1931) was a Colombian engineer and Muisca scholar. He is best known for his 1922 publication La Civilización Chibcha; "The Muisca civilisation". Triana wrote a number of books about the Muisca and their culture. Miguel Triana especially contributed to the knowledge of the religion, society and the creation of rock art throughout the Muisca Confederation. Triana was the first Colombian investigator relating the Muisca culture with the pictographs. He described hundreds of rock paintings and carvings in his book El jeroglífico Chibcha.

Biography 

Miguel Triana was born on 26 November 1859 in the Granadine Confederation capital Bogotá as son of general Domingo de San Vicente y de los Santos Triana Loboguerrero and Dolores (or Clotilde) Ruiz de Cote. He had a brother Felipe Triana Ruiz de Cote. He attended the Colegio del Rosario until age 18 and studied civil and military engineering at the Escuela de Ingeniería del Coronel Antonio de Narváez where he graduated in 1880.

Triana worked as an engineer for the train line of Puerto Wilches, finished in 1883, the central northern highway and train tracks in Cúcuta and on irrigation projects in the Valley of Sogamoso as part of a study to dewater Lake Tota. From 1890 Triana was director of public works in Nariño and from 1917 manager of the Municipal Tramway of Bogotá.

Miguel Triana was professor in physics, hydraulics, geometry, trigonometry and drawing at the faculty of Engineering of the Universidad Nacional in Bogotá. He was affiliated with various organisations in Colombia, among others: Sociedad Físico-Literaria de Bogotá, El Ateneo, Sociedad de Ingenieros Civiles de los Estados Unidos, Sociedad Colombiana de Ciencias Naturales and the Sociedad Colombiana de Ingenieros, founded by Triana in 1887.

Triana was interested in the former inhabitants of the Altiplano Cundiboyacense where he was born and studied the history of the Muisca (also called "Chibcha", as the language they speak) and in 1922 he published his mayor work La Civilización Chibcha Other works are El jeroglífico Chibcha and Las leyendas Chibchas. The former work was the result of forty years of studying rock art in Boyacá, Cundinamarca, Meta and other parts of Colombia.

Miguel Triana married Juana Echeverri and the couple got one son, Jorge Felipe Triana Echeverri. Triana died on 29 April 1931 in his city of birth.

Books 
 1970 - El jeroglífico Chibcha - posthumously
 1950 - Por el sur de Colombia: excursión pintoresca y científica al Putumayo - posthumously
 1924 - Petroglifos de la Mesa Central de Colombia
 1922 - La civilización Chibcha
 1915 - Improvements for the mouth of the Magdalena River
 1913 - Al Meta
 1907 - Por el sur de Colombia: excursión pintoresca y científica al Putumayo
 2021 - ''Por el sur de Colombia, reedición de Editorial Universidad del Cauca https://www.unicauca.edu.co/editorial/

See also 

 List of Muisca scholars
 Muisca
 Muisca religion
 José Jerónimo Triana

References

Notable works by Miguel Triana

Bibliography 
 
 
 

1859 births
1931 deaths
Colombian engineers
20th-century Colombian historians
Muisca scholars
People from Bogotá
_
Muisca mythology and religion